Jenő Medveczky (1902-1969) was a Hungarian painter significant to Hungarian neo-classic painting.

References 

 

1902 births
1969 deaths
20th-century Hungarian painters
Hungarian male painters
20th-century Hungarian male artists